Arytera is a genus of about twenty–eight species known to science, of trees and shrubs and constituting part of the plant family Sapindaceae. They grow naturally in New Guinea, Indonesia, New Caledonia, Australia, the Solomon Islands, Vanuatu, Fiji, Samoa, Tonga; and the most widespread species and type species A. littoralis grows throughout Malesia and across Southeast Asia, from NE. India, southern China, Borneo, Malaysia, Singapore, Indonesia and the Philippines to as far east as New Guinea and the Solomon Islands.

The eleven Australian species may have the common name coogera and they grow naturally in the rainforests of eastern Australia and the Northern Territory.

Formerly included here were three species now in the genus Mischarytera.

Naming and classification
European science formally named and described this genus and the type species in 1847, authored by botanist Carl Ludwig Blume.

In 1879 botanist Ludwig A. T. Radlkofer published formal scientific descriptions of numerous species new to European science.

In 1993 botanist Hubert Turner formally described 8 species new to science found growing naturally in New Guinea, the Solomon Islands and north eastern Australia. In 1994 his treatment of the genus in Flora Malesiana was published.

Species
This listing was sourced from the Australian Plant Name Index and Australian Plant Census, the Australian Tropical Rainforest Plants information system, Flora Malesiana, Fruits of the Australian Tropical Rainforest, the Census of Vascular Plants of Papua New Guinea, the Checklist of the vascular indigenous Flora of New Caledonia, Rainforest trees of Samoa, Flora Vitiensis (Fiji), the Flora of Tonga, the Flora of New South Wales, and the Flora of Australia.

 Arytera arcuata  – New Caledonia endemic
 Arytera bifoliata  – Tonga
 Arytera bifoliolata  – New Guinea, NT, Qld, Australia
 Arytera brachyphylla  – New Guinea
 Arytera brackenridgei  – Fiji, Tonga, Vanuatu, Samoa, New Guinea
 Arytera chartacea  – New Caledonia endemic
 Arytera collina  – New Caledonia endemic

 Arytera densiflora  – New Guinea
 Arytera dictyoneura  – Qld, Australia
 Arytera distylis  – NSW, Qld, Australia
 Arytera divaricata  – NSW, Qld, Australia, New Guinea

 Arytera foveolata  – Qld, Australia

 Arytera gracilipes  – New Caledonia endemic

 Arytera lepidota  – New Caledonia endemic
 Arytera lineosquamulata  – New Guinea, NE. Qld, Australia
 Arytera littoralis  – NE. India, SE Asia, S. China, throughout Malesia incl. to New Guinea and Solomon Islands

 Arytera microphylla  – Qld, Australia
 Arytera miniata  – New Guinea

 Arytera morobeana  – New Guinea
 Arytera multijuga  – New Guinea
 Arytera musca  – New Guinea
 Arytera nekorensis  – New Caledonia endemic –  vulnerable
 Arytera neoebudensis  – New Guinea, New Caledonia
 Arytera novaebrittanniae  – New Guinea, Solomon Islands

 Arytera oshanesiana  – Qld, Australia

 Arytera pauciflora  – Qld, Australia
 Arytera pseudofoveolata  – New Guinea, Cape York Peninsula, Qld, Australia

Species provisionally named, described and accepted according to the authoritative Australian Plant Census  while awaiting formal publication
 Arytera sp. Dryander Creek (P.R.Sharpe 4184) Qld Herbarium – Qld, Australia

Formerly included here
 Arytera bullata   ⇒  Mischarytera bullata  – New Guinea endemic
 Arytera lautereriana   ⇒  Mischarytera lautereriana , corduroy tamarind – NE. to SE. Qld Australia endemic
 Arytera macrobotrys   ⇒  Mischarytera macrobotrys  – New Guinea and Cape York Peninsula, Qld, Australia

References

Cited works 

 
 
 
 

 
Sapindaceae genera